Paul Nicklen (born July 21, 1968) is a Canadian photographer, film-maker, author and marine biologist.

Early life 
Paul Nicklen was born on July 21, 1968, in Tisdale, Saskatchewan, Canada. By the mid-seventies, Paul's family - made up of his parents, a teacher and mechanic, and his brother, moved to the tiny Inuit town of Baffin Island in Canada’s Arctic Circle. The Nicklen family was one of three non-Inuit families in the area.

Career
Since the beginning of his career in conservation photography, Nicklen has quickly become the only Canadian photographer for National Geographic Magazine, and has published eleven stories for National Geographic. Along with these feats, he is a member of the International League of Conservation Photographers (ILCP). He has written several books. Major exhibits of his work include Extreme Exposure at the Annenberg Space for Photography in Los Angeles, California in 2009 and most recently, he opened the Paul Nicklen Gallery in Soho, New York City, New York in April 2017 as a space for conservationist photographers and other artists to participate in the fine art scene.

In 2011, Nicklen was a speaker at TED2011.

In 2014, Nicklen co-founded an organization that uses visual storytelling and photography to further the cause of ocean conservation with modern conservation photography pioneer Cristina Mittermeier. The foundation is a non-profit.

Awards
Nicklen has been awarded the BBC Wildlife Photographer of the Year and the World Press Photo for Photojournalism." He has also received awards from Pictures of the Year International, Communication Arts,  and the Natural Resources Defense Council BioGems Visionary Award. 

A short list of awards includes:
World Press Photo First Prize, Nature Stories 2003 
World Press Photo First Prize, Nature Stories 2006
World Press Photo Second prize, Nature Stories 2007
World Press Photo Third Prize, Nature Stories 2007
World Press Photo First Prize, Nature Stories 2009
World Press Photo First Prize, Nature Stories 2010
Award of Excellence, Pictures of the Year International Competition 2010
Wildlife Photographer of the Year, BBC Wildlife and Natural History Museum 2012
World Press Photo First Prize, Nature Stories 2013
Lifetime Achievement Award, University of Victoria, British Columbia, Canada
Honorary Doctor of Science, University of Victoria, British Columbia, Canada

Magazine articles 
 National Geographic South Georgia (December 2009)
 National Geographic Svalbard (April 2009)
 National Geographic Sailfish (September 2008)
 National Geographic Hunting Narwhals (August 2007)
 National Geographic Vanishing Sea Ice (June 2007)
 National Geographic Leopard Seals (November 2006)
 National Geographic Where Currents Collide (August 2006)
4 other stories by Paul Nicklen can be found on the National Geographic website.

Books 
 Seasons of the Arctic – 2000, Sierra Club Books, San Francisco
 Polar Obsession – 2009, National Geographic Society
 Bear-Spirit of the Wild – 2013, National Geographic Society
Born to Ice - 2018, teNeues Publishing Company

References

External links

 

University of Victoria alumni
Canadian photographers
Living people
1968 births
National Geographic photographers
Members of the Order of Canada